George Benjamin Winn (October 26, 1897 – November 1, 1969) was a professional baseball pitcher. He played parts of three seasons in Major League Baseball between 1919 and 1923 for the Boston Red Sox (1919) and Cleveland Indians (1922–23). A native of Perry, Georgia, he attended Mercer University. 
 
In a three-season career, Winn, who was nicknamed "Breezy" and "Lefty", posted a 1–2 record with a 4.69 ERA in 12 appearances, including three starts, one complete game, 50 hits allowed, seven strikeouts, seven walks, and 40.1 innings pitched. 
 
Winn died at the age of 72 in Roberta, Georgia.

External links

Retrosheet

Major League Baseball pitchers
Boston Red Sox players
Cleveland Indians players
Des Moines Boosters players
Oakland Oaks (baseball) players
Milwaukee Brewers (minor league) players
Spartanburg Spartans players
Mercer Bears baseball players
Baseball players from Georgia (U.S. state)
People from Perry, Georgia
1897 births
1969 deaths
Nashville Vols players